Hebius pryeri, Pryer's keelback, is a species of snake of the family Colubridae. The snake is found on the Ryukyu Islands.

References 

pryeri
Reptiles of Japan
Reptiles described in 1887
Taxa named by George Albert Boulenger